The Larson Nunataks are a small cluster of nunataks lying along the east side of the Forrestal Range,  southeast of Mount Malville, in the Pensacola Mountains of Antarctica. The group was mapped by the United States Geological Survey from surveys and U.S. Navy air photos, 1956–66, and was named by the Advisory Committee on Antarctic Names for Larry R. Larson, an aviation electronics technician at Ellsworth Station, winter 1957.

References

Nunataks of Queen Elizabeth Land